Mudappallur  is a village in the Palakkad district of the state of Kerala in India. It is a small locality comes under the Vandazhi-II village, Alathur Taluk. Mudappallur's Postal Index Number is 678705.

Location 
Mudappallur is situated in State Highway 58 (SH 58) is a State Highway in Kerala, India that starts in Vadakkancherry and ends in Pollachi. Mudappallur is located 5 km away from Vadakkencherry and 10 km from Alathur. Mangalam Dam is 10 km nearer to this area which is a place of tourist interest. Nelliambathy, the tourist hill station, is 38 km from Mudappallur.

Educational institutions 
Government High School, NSS UP School and lions college of science are the three institute of this place.

Temples 
The two important temples of the village are Azhikulangara Bhagavathi temple and Lord Shiva temple. Sree cheerumba Baghavathy temple at Payyaroad, Sree Cheermba Kavu, Kunnu parambu, Sree Subramanyan temple, Panthaparambu, Sree Angala Parameswari Temple, Manalodi, Panthaparambu, Sree Mariyamman temple, Manalodi and Mathur are other temples at Mudappallur.

Festival 

Mudappallur Vela: 
Mudappallur vela or Azhikulangara Bhagavathi vela celebrated on 22 May of each year.
Fireworks, Panchavadhyam, Chenda melam are the main attractions of the festival. Sree Sastha from Lord Shiva temple visiting Bagavathy is the myth of the festival

Mosques 
Mudappallur has two mosques, Salafi Masjid operated by Kerala Nadvathul Mujahideen and a Sunnathu Jam'ath Masjid operated by Samastha Kerala Jamiyyathul Ulama.

References 

Villages in Palakkad district